The 4 arrondissements of the Ardennes department are:
 Arrondissement of Charleville-Mézières, (prefecture of the Ardennes department: Charleville-Mézières) with 157 communes. The population of the arrondissement was 158,005 in 2016.  
 Arrondissement of Rethel, (subprefecture: Rethel) with 101 communes.  The population of the arrondissement was 37,384 in 2016.  
 Arrondissement of Sedan, (subprefecture: Sedan) with 73 communes.  The population of the arrondissement was 58,136 in 2016.  
 Arrondissement of Vouziers, (subprefecture: Vouziers) with 118 communes.  The population of the arrondissement was 21,846 in 2016.

History

In 1800 the arrondissements of Mézières, Rethel, Rocroi, Sedan and Vouziers were established. The arrondissements of Rocroi and Sedan were disbanded in 1926. The arrondissement of Sedan was restored in 1942.

References

Ardennes